Christy Goldfuss is an American government official who chaired the Council on Environmental Quality (CEQ) within the Executive Office of the President from 2015 to 2017. She served as Deputy Director of the National Park Service in the Obama administration.  She also worked as a legislative staff member for the House Committee on Natural Resources and as a reporter.

Before joining the park service, she worked at the Center for American Progress, a liberal think tank, where she was head of the public lands project

Following the end of Barack Obama's presidency, Goldfuss rejoined the Center for American Progress. She is a member of the National Infrastructure Advisory Council.

References

Living people
Year of birth missing (living people)
National Park Service personnel
Center for American Progress people
American women in politics
Obama administration personnel
21st-century American women politicians
21st-century American politicians